Burdick is an unincorporated town in Jackson Township, Porter County, in the U.S. state of Indiana.

History
A post office was established at Burdick in 1871, and remained in operation until it was discontinued in 1933. The community was named for A. C. Burdick, a businessperson in the lumber industry.

Geography

References

Unincorporated communities in Porter County, Indiana
Unincorporated communities in Indiana